Bacterial rhodopsin may refer to:

 Microbial rhodopsin, also known as type-I rhodopsin
 Bacteriorhodopsin, a type of microbial rhodopsin